Juditten refers to:
Juditten, the German name of Mendeleyevo, Kaliningrad, Kaliningrad Oblast, Russia
Juditten Church, the oldest church of Sambia
Juditten, the German name of Judyty, Warmian-Masurian Voivodeship, Poland
Judittenhof, the German name of Judyty, Pomeranian Voivodeship, Poland